Peeter Tulviste (28 October 1945 in Tallinn – 11 March 2017) was an Estonian psychologist, educator and politician. He was a member of X and XI Riigikogu.

Tulviste was a professor at the University of Tartu and from 1993 until 1998 he was the rector of the university. From 1994 he was a member of the Estonian Academy of Sciences. At the same time, he was the Vice-President of the Academy from 1994 to 2004, and from 1994 to 1999 and from 2004 to 2009 he headed the Department of Humanities and Social Sciences of the academy.

References

1945 births
2017 deaths
Estonian psychologists
Isamaa politicians
Members of the Riigikogu, 2003–2007
Recipients of the Order of the National Coat of Arms, 3rd Class
Recipients of the Order of the National Coat of Arms, 4th Class
Burials at Raadi cemetery
Moscow State University alumni
Academic staff of the University of Tartu
Rectors of the University of Tartu
People from Tallinn
Politicians from Tallinn
Members of the Riigikogu, 2007–2011